Dave de Jong (born 26 April 1975 in the Netherlands) is a Dutch retired footballer.

Career

In 2003, trialed with South Korean side Seongnam. However, he was threatened by the intermediary who arranged the trial after expressing desire to leave the trial. Without the Seongman head coach knowing, he left for the Netherlands and had to hide at the airport.

References

External links
 

Dutch footballers
Living people
1975 births
Association football defenders
Willem II (football club) players
De Graafschap players
NAC Breda players
K.V. Mechelen players
VfL Osnabrück players
Footballers from Rotterdam